USS Druid (SP-321) was a private yacht launched 10 February 1902 as Rheclair that was built for Daniel G. Reid. Reid sold the yacht to Senator Nelson W. Aldrich who renamed the yacht Nirvana only just over a year before his death. Aldrich's estate chartered Nirvana to John Wanamaker until it was bought by his son Rodman Wanamaker who used the yacht for cruising until a fire on 14 December 1916, just before a cruise south, severely damaged the vessel. He chartered an alternate vessel for his trip south and, after full repairs, the yacht was sold to Walter W. Dwyer who gave it the name Druid with intentions to sell the yacht to the government in order to finance a shipyard venture in Pensacola, Florida.

Druid was purchased for $90,000 by the United States Navy, commissioned USS Druid on 17 September 1917 and converted into a patrol vessel in commission from 1917 to 1919. She was sent to the European coast and the Mediterranean to protect Allied shipping from German submarines and other dangers.

After a little over four months in reserve Druid was decommissioned on 28 May 1919 and sold on 10 September 1919 to Carl K. MacFadden who renamed the vessel Maracay and sold it to Venezuelan buyers by 30 June 1922 when the List of Merchant Vessels of the United States shows it among those changing to foreign interest.

Construction and specifications 
The yacht was built in 1902 as a private steam yacht Rheclair designed by Clinton H. Crane of Tams, Lemoine & Crane and built by the Burlee Dry Dock Company of Staten Island, New York as hull number 234 for Daniel G. Reid, Commodore of the Atlantic Yacht Club. Rheclair was launched on 10 February 1902 and assigned the official number of 111412 and the call letters KRQN on registration.

A 1-kilowatt wireless set was also installed.

A continuous steel deck house covered in teak with a lounge forward, dining room, galley, pantry and smoking room with a passageway connecting all compartments to avoid necessity of going on the open deck. Seven staterooms, each with bathroom, for owner and guests were fore and aft of the machinery space on the second deck. The electric plant provided for ice machines, refrigeration and machinery such as windlasses as well as lighting.

Private yacht

Rheclair 
The yacht was the flagship of the Atlantic Yacht Club and led the club's annual cruises. Reid was also a member of the New York Yacht Club with Rheclair having the private signal of a swallowtail pennant with a red cross on white with a blue "R" in the upper left quadrant. The magazine Sail and Sweep featured a full page photo of Rheclair in its June, 1904 issue. In 1906 the yacht was fitted with new propellers. The yacht participated in the massive two-week Hudson–Fulton Celebration and the River during September–October 1909. Rheclair was present for the Inaugural Naval Parade on 25 September.

In 1914 Daniel G. Reid sold Rheclair to Senator Nelson W. Aldrich who renamed the yacht Nirvana.

Nirvana 
Senator Aldrich had chartered steam yachts for summer use but after his retirement to Providence, Rhode Island, bought the yacht that had ten staterooms and carried a crew of thirty-five. The vessel was to be refurbished and altered in New York before being brought to Narragansett Bay. Aldrich died the next year, 16 April 1915, and the yacht was chartered to John Wanamaker by the estate.

John Wanamaker's son Rodman Wanamaker bought Nirvana from the estate, keeping the name, using the yacht for cruising. On 14 December 1916 a fire severely damaged Nirvana while fitting out for a southern cruise. The fire started in the engine room, spread to the forecastle and endangered other large yachts nearby. The damage was to be quickly repaired, but Wanamaker chartered the houseboat Osiris for his cruise.

Shortly after, by April 1917, Wanamaker had sold Nirvana to Walter W. Dwyer with the repaired yacht sent south.

Druid 
By 1 May 1917 the Dwyer brothers had renamed the yacht and taken Druid to Pensacola, Florida with plans to sell the yacht to the government for naval service and invest the proceeds in a site and construction of a shipyard in Pensacola.

World War I service 
Druid was purchased for $90,000 by the Navy in Havana, Cuba, from her owner, W. W. Dwyer of New York City, on 2 June 1917. The Navy began outfitting Druid for World War I "distant service" and commissioned her as USS Druid on 17 September 1917. The ship was fitted with two 3-inch 50 caliber guns and two machine guns.

The ship spent the rest of the war performing patrol, escort, and towing duties in the western Mediterranean, the Strait of Gibraltar, and off the coast of Portugal.

Coast Guard Captain Leroy Reinburg of  engaged enemy submarines near the Strait of Gibraltar in November 1918. The Druid was operating as part of the Gibraltar Barrage, a squadron of American and British ships assigned to keeping enemy U-boats from passing from the Mediterranean into the Atlantic. On 8 November 1918, men aboard USS Druid sighted three surfaced submarines going through the strait. The weather was foul and the seas rough but the barrage squadron attacked anyway, first with gunfire and then with depth charges.  reported that she shot a hole through one of the submarines' conning towers with a  gun but other than that no other damage was thought to have occurred. USS Druid and her compatriots were successful in defending the strait and on the following day the Americans helped rescue the British crew of the battleship  which had been torpedoed by  while passing through Gibraltar into the Mediterranean. The war ended three days later on 11 November. Captain Reinburg was awarded the Navy Cross for his distinguished service commanding Druid.

Druid returned to the United States following the armistice with Germany, which took place on 11 November 1918.

Post-war disposition 
Druid was placed in reserve in New London, Connecticut, on 3 January 1919 and decommissioned on 28 May 1919. She was sold on 10 September 1919.

The 13 November 1920 issue of The Nautical Gazette has a legal notice that under the authority of the Commissioner of Navigation the application of Carl K. MacFadden to change the name of the steam yacht, official number 111412, from Druid to Maracay has been approved. In 1921 registers the yacht's home port is shown as New York but in 1922 the report for the year ended 30 June 1922 shows Maracay as Venezuelan in the list of vessels abandoned, sold to aliens or otherwise changing in nature of registration.

Footnotes

References

External links 
 Steam yacht Rheclair (Library of Congress photo collection)
 USS Druid (SP-321), 1917-1919 (Archived Naval History And Heritage Command page at ibiblo.com.)
 NavSource Online: Section Patrol Craft Photo Archive: Druid (SP 321)

Patrol vessels of the United States Navy
World War I patrol vessels of the United States
Steam yachts
Ships built in Staten Island
1902 ships